Nelson Garden Arena (formerly named Dackehallen) is an indoor arena in Tingsryd, Sweden. It was completed in 1969 and has a capacity of 3,400 spectators. Its current name was inaugurated in September 2011.

References 

Ice hockey venues in Sweden
Indoor ice hockey venues in Sweden